Marco Zanni (born 11 July 1986) is an Italian politician, member of the European Parliament for the League.

Biography
Marco Zanni was born in Lovere, near Bergamo, in 1986. He graduated in business administration at the Bocconi University of Milan and then studied at the ESADE Business School in Barcelona. After completing his postgraduate degree, he was hired by Banca IMI, an Italian investment bank.

In May 2014, he stood in the European Parliament election for the populist and Eurosceptic Five Star Movement. He was elected in the North-West Italy constituency, with 16,940 personal preferences.

On 11 January 2017, after the failed attempt of the M5S to join the liberal ALDE group, Zanni left the movement, joining the right-wing Europe of Nations and Freedom (ENF) group. On 15 May 2018, he became a member of the League, the right-wing populist party led by Matteo Salvini.

Zanni was re-elected in the 2019 European election, with 18,019 votes. The election was characterized by a strong showing of the League, that became the most-voted party in Italy, with more than 34% of votes. On 13 June, he was appointed leader of the right wing Identity and Democracy (ID) group.

References

1986 births
Living people
Members of the European Parliament for Italy
MEPs for Italy 2014–2019
MEPs for Italy 2019–2024
Lega Nord politicians
Five Star Movement politicians
Politicians from Bergamo
People from Lovere